The Nationality law of Myanmar currently recognises three categories of citizens, namely citizen, associate citizen and naturalised citizen, according to the 1982 Citizenship Law. Citizens, as defined by the 1947 Constitution, are persons who belong to an "indigenous race", have a grandparent from an "indigenous race", are children of citizens, or lived in British Burma prior to 1942.

Under this law, citizens are required to obtain a National Registration Card (NRC), while non-citizens are given a Foreign Registration Card (FRC). Citizens whose parents hold FRCs are not allowed to run for public office.

Myanmar has a stratified citizenship system. Burmese citizens' rights are distinctively different depending on the category they belong to and based on how one's forebearers acquired their own citizenship category. 

 Full citizens are descendants of residents who lived in Burma prior to 1823 or were born to parents who were citizens at the time of birth.
 Associate citizens are those who acquired citizenship through the 1948 Union Citizenship Law.
 Naturalized citizens are those who lived in Burma before 4 January 1948 and applied for citizenship after 1982.

Dual citizenship
Dual citizenship is not recognised by Myanmar.

Naturalisation
Foreigners who have been in the country since 1948 can also apply for nationality.

Denial of citizenship to Rohingya
Burmese law does not consider Rohingyas as one of the 135 legally recognised ethnic groups of Myanmar, thus denying most of them Myanmar citizenship. The official claim of the Government of Myanmar is that the Rohingya people are the "citizens of Bangladesh", however the Government of Bangladesh does not recognize this claim, thus leaving the Rohingya stateless.

See also
Human rights in Myanmar
Visa requirements for Myanmar citizens

References

Law of Myanmar
Nationality law
Rohingya people